Fushan County is a county in prefecture-level city of Linfen, in southern Shanxi Province, China. The county spans an area of 940.6 square kilometers, and has a population of 127,831 as of 2010.

History 
During the Spring and Autumn Period, the area of present-day Fushan County belonged to the Jin State. The area would later become part of the Wei during the Warring States Period.

The area was part of the Qin Dynasty, administered under  in the Hedong Commandery.

Fushan County was first set up in 619 CE.

Upon the establishment of the Ming Dynasty, the area would be re-organized as part of the Pingyang Prefecture, which it would remain under throughout the Ming Dynasty as well as the Qing Dynasty.

On September 13, 2009, county officials allegedly launched a raid against an unregistered church in the county, stating that the church was built illegally. According to the group ChinaAid, several worshipers were struck, and some of them were taken to hospital. The building was destroyed, and various people involved with the church were detained. A county executive officer said that, as the church was not licensed, one could not say that it was a "place of worship", but the issue was merely a matter of demolishing an illegal structure "without a land certificate or construction design. The construction department and the land department government had talked to them several times before it was pulled down." he denied any violence had taken place, and refused to give his name to reporters.

Geography 
Fushan County is located in the south of Shanxi Province, bordering Yaodu District and Xiangfen County to the west, Yicheng County to the south, Anze County to the east, Gu County to the north, and Qinshui County to the southeast. The county varies in altitude from 650 meters in height to 1,511.8 meters in height.

Climate 
The annual average temperature in Fushan County is 11.2 °C, the annual average frost-free period is 191 days, the annual average precipitation is 534.2 millimeters, and the average amount of sunshine per year totals 2,298.8 hours.

Administrative divisions
Fushan County has two towns and seven townships.

Economy 
Fushan County has a number of significant mineral deposits, including iron, coal, gold, baryte, and clay. The county's iron ore reserves total 120 million tons, accounting for 60% of the total reserves of Linfen. The proven reserves of coal total 7.6 billion tons, the proven reserves of gold total 0.76 million tons, the proven reserves of limestone total 19.47 million tons, the proven reserves of baryte total 630,000 tons, and the proven reserves of refractory clay total 839,000 tons.

Transportation

Rail 
The Linfen Central-South railway, the Houma–Yueshan railway, and the Datong–Puzhou railway all pass through Fushan County.

Road 
National Highway 208, National Highway 309, and the  section of the G22 Qingdao–Lanzhou Expressway all pass through Fushan County.

Notes and references

County-level divisions of Shanxi